Primary cutaneous aspergillosis is a rare skin condition most often occurring at the site of intravenous cannulas in immunosuppressed patients.

See also 
 Aspergillosis

References 

Mycosis-related cutaneous conditions